The Secretary of Administration is a member of the Virginia Governor's Cabinet.  The office is currently vacant.

List of Secretaries of Administration

Secretary of Administration (July 1, 1972 – July 1, 1976)
 T. Edward Temple (1972–1974)
 Maurice B. Rowe (1974–1976)

Secretary of Administration and Finance (July 1, 1976 – July 1, 1984)
 Maurice B. Rowe (1976–1978)
 Charles Walker (1978–1981)
 Stuart Connock (1981–1982)
 Wayne F. Anderson (1982–1984)

Secretary of Administration (July 1, 1984 – present)
 Andrew B. Fogarty (1984–1985)
 David K. McCloud (1985–1986)
 Carolyn J. Moss (1986–1990)
 Ruby Grant Martin (1990–1994)
 Michael E. Thomas (1994–1998)
 G. Bryan Slater (1998–2001)
 Donald L. Moseley (2001–2002)
 Sandra Bowen (2002–2006)
 Viola Baskerville (2006–2010)
 Lisa Hicks-Thomas (2010–2014)
 Nancy Rodrigues (2014–2018)
 Keyanna Conner (2018–2020)
 Grindly Johnson (2020–2022)
 Lyn McDermid (nominee)

References

Government agencies established in 1972
1972 establishments in Virginia
Administration
Administration